McGehee Catfish Restaurant Airport  is a privately owned, public-use airport located five nautical miles (6 mi, 9 km) southwest of the central business district of Marietta, a city in Love County, Oklahoma, United States.

The runway is currently closed indefinitely.

Facilities and aircraft 
It has one runway designated 17/35 with a turf surface measuring 2,450 by 55 feet (747 x 17 m).
The airport is closed and non-operational as of February 2020.

References

External links 
 McGehee's Catfish Restaurant, official site
 
 Airport page from the Oklahoma Aeronautics Commission Airport Directory
 Aerial photo as of 31 January 1995 from USGS The National Map

Defunct airports in Oklahoma
Airports in Oklahoma
Buildings and structures in Love County, Oklahoma